PetroVietnam (PVN) is the trading name of the Vietnam Oil and Gas Group. PetroVietnam has developed rapidly since it was established in 1977, and its activities, through its various companies and wholly owned subsidiaries, now cover all the operations from oil and gas exploration and production to storage, processing, transportation, distribution and services. Wholly owned by the Vietnamese central government, it is responsible for all oil and gas resources in the country and has become its country's largest oil producer and second-largest power producer.

Operations
PetroVietnam also carries out exploration activities in Malaysia, Indonesia, Mongolia, Myanmar and Algeria, and recovers oil in Iraq and Malaysia.

International cooperation
In order to help pay for the costs stemming from the Deepwater Horizon explosion, BP plans to sell its stakes in gas and oil properties in Vietnam. It maintains joint ownership of such projects — Lan Tay-Lan Do gas field and Nam Con Son pipeline — with ONGC, PetroVietnam, and ConocoPhillips. Moreover, its partners will be given priority when purchasing its shares should Hanoi approve the transaction. India has expressed interest in buying BP's assets to secure needed energy resources for its fast-growing economy.

In 2010, PetroVietnam Group has secured $1 billion loan from government bond proceeds and BNP Paribas for the Dung Quat oil refinery Plant No 1, in Vietnam, which began operating at 100% production capacity in August 2010.

Subsidiaries and joint-ventures
PetroVietnam has several subsidiaries:
 Petrovietnam Exploration Production Corporation (PVEP)
 Petrovietnam Gas Corporation (PV Gas)
 Vietnam Steel Gas Pipeline Joint-Stock Corporation (PV Pipe)
 Petrovietnam Oil Corporation (PV Oil)
 Petrovietnam Power Corporation (PV Power)
 Binh Son Refinery Ltd. (BSR)
 Petec Trading and Investment Corporation
 PetroVietnam University (Trường Đại học Dầu khí Việt Nam) 

PetroVietnam holds controlling stakes in the following companies:
 PetroVietnam Drilling & Well Services Joint Stock Corporation (PV Drilling)
 PetroVietnam Technical Service Joint Stock Corporation (PTSC)
 PetroVietnam Transportation Joint Stock Corporation (PV Trans)
 PetroVietnam Finance Joint Stock Corporation (PVFC)
 PetroVietnam Insurance Joint Stock Corporation (PVI)
 PetroVietnam General Service Joint Stock Corporation (Petrosetco)
 PetroVietnam Construction Joint Stock Corporation (PVC)
 PetroVietnam Fertilizer and Chemicals Joint Stock Corporation (PVFCCo)
 Drilling Mud Joint Stock Corporation (DMC)
 Joint Venture Vietsovpetro (VSP)
 PetroVietnam Petrochemicals and Fibre Joint Stock Company (PV Tex), a joint-venture set up with textile manufacturer Vinatex to build Vietnam's first polyester fiber plant. The factory will be located in Haiphong and use by-products from oil-refining.
 Vietnam Energy Inspection Joint Stock Company (EIC)
 Phuoc An Port Construction and Investment Joint Stock Company (PAP)
 Petrovietnam Construction Investment Consultant Joint Stock Company (PCIC)

Together with Gazprom the company has established Vietgazprom.

References

External links

Petrovietnam's Manpower Supply and Services Company
Information of Vietnam Oil and Gas Group

Oil and gas companies of Vietnam
Government-owned companies of Vietnam
Vi
Energy companies established in 1977
Non-renewable resource companies established in 1977
1977 establishments in Vietnam
Companies based in Hanoi
Vietnamese brands